William Brouncker, 2nd Viscount Brouncker, FRS (1620 – 5 April 1684) was an Irish born mathematician who introduced Brouncker's formula, and was the first president of the Royal Society. He was also a civil servant, serving as a commissioner of the Royal Navy. He was a friend and colleague of Samuel Pepys, and features prominently in the Great Diary.

Biography

Brouncker was born in Castlelyons, County Cork, the elder son of William Brouncker (1585–1649), 1st Viscount Brouncker and Winifred, daughter of Sir William Leigh of Newnham. His family came originally from Melksham in Wiltshire. His grandfather Sir Henry Brouncker (died 1607) had been Lord President of Munster 1603–1607, and settled his family in Ireland.

His father was created a viscount in the Peerage of Ireland in 1645 for his services to the Crown. Although the first viscount had fought for the Crown in the Anglo-Scots war of 1639, malicious gossip said that he paid the then enormous sum of £1200 for the title and was almost ruined as a result. He died only a few months afterwards.

William obtained a DM at the University of Oxford in 1647. Until 1660 he played no part in public life: being a staunch Royalist, he felt it best to live quietly and devote himself to his mathematical studies. He was one of the founders and the first president of the Royal Society. In 1662, he became chancellor to Queen Catherine, then head of the Saint Catherine's Hospital.

He was appointed one of the commissioners of the Royal Navy in 1664, and his career thereafter can be traced in the Diary of Samuel Pepys; despite their frequent disagreements, Samuel Pepys on the whole respected Brouncker more than most of his other colleagues, writing in 1668 that "in truth he is the best of them".

Although his attendance at the Royal Society had become infrequent, and he had quarrelled with some of his fellow members, he was nonetheless greatly displeased to be deprived of the presidency in 1677.

He was commissioner for executing the office of Lord High Admiral of England from 1679.

Abigail Williams

Brouncker never married, but lived for many years with the actress Abigail Williams (much to Pepys' disgust) and left most of his property to her. She was the daughter of Sir Henry Clere (died 1622), first and last of the Clere Baronets, and the estranged wife of John Williams, otherwise Cromwell, second son of Sir Oliver Cromwell, and first cousin to the renowned Oliver Cromwell. She and John had a son and a daughter. The fire of 1673 which destroyed the Royal Navy Office started in her private closet: this is unlikely to have improved her relations with Samuel Pepys, whose private apartments were also destroyed in the blaze.

On Brouncker's death in 1684, his title passed to his brother Henry, one of the most detested men of the era. William left him almost nothing in his will "for reasons I think not fit to mention".

Mathematical works 

His mathematical work concerned in particular the calculations of the lengths of the parabola and cycloid, and the quadrature of the hyperbola, which requires approximation of the natural logarithm function by infinite series. He was the first European to solve what is now known as Pell's equation. He was the first in England to take interest in generalized continued fractions and, following the work of John Wallis, he provided development in the generalized continued fraction of pi.

Brouncker's formula 

This formula provides a development of π/4 in a generalized continued fraction:

The convergents are related to the Leibniz formula for pi: for instance

and

Because of its slow convergence, Brouncker's formula is not useful for practical computations of π.

Brouncker's formula can also be expressed as

See also
 List of presidents of the Royal Society

References

External links 

 
 

1620 births
1684 deaths
17th-century English mathematicians
Founder Fellows of the Royal Society
Lords of the Admiralty
Presidents of the Royal Society
Viscounts in the Peerage of Ireland
17th-century English medical doctors